Vive Le Rock  is the third solo album by Adam Ant, released in September 1985.

Production 
Producer Tony Visconti, famous for his 1970s work with Ant's heroes Marc Bolan and David Bowie, commented on his work with Ant on Vive Le Rock: "What a creative ball of energy! He was great to work with. He's very opinionated and knows what he wants. We didn't quite agree during the mixes, he kind of wanted everything very trebly and I'm a bassey kind of producer."

The album was a realisation of the new "rockers in space" ethic and look Adam Ant had begun with the hit UK single "Apollo 9" in September 1984, which peaked at number 13.

Release 
"Apollo 9" was released as a single a year before Vive Le Rock's release, and was a chart hit. However, the album received only minor attention in the United States, peaking at number 131, and number 42 in the United Kingdom. The title track was the one single from the album released in the US. He performed "Vive Le Rock" at the 1985 benefit concert Live Aid. It was the only song he played at the show, as the band preceding him on the bill, The Boomtown Rats (for whom concert co-organiser Bob Geldof was the front man) overran their allotted time. Ant has said that the failure of Vive Le Rock, and his then-current record label's unwillingness to promote it, left him depressed and unenthusiastic about his future in music. This led to his decision to focus primarily on his acting career, not releasing another album until Manners & Physique in 1990.

Twelfth track "Human Bondage Den" was released on the original cassette and CD release of this album (as a bonus non-LP track). Most re-releases did not feature this track until Columbia Records re-released the album in 2005, along with seven other bonus tracks.

Track listing
All songs written by Adam Ant and Marco Pirroni.
Side one
"Vive Le Rock" – 3:39
"Miss Thing" – 3:08
"Razor Keen" – 3:49
"Rip Down" – 3:23
"Scorpio Rising" – 4:04

Side two
"Apollo 9" – 3:22
"Hell's Eight Acres" – 3:51
"Mohair Lockeroom Pin-Up Boys" – 3:14
"No Zap" – 3:14
"P.O.E." – 3:24
"Apollo 9 (A cappella Reprise)" – 1:32 (secret track)

CD and cassette versions bonus track
"Human Bondage Den" - 3:07

2005 reissue bonus tracks
"Vive Le Rock" (Unreleased 12" Mix) - 7:28
"Apollo 9" (Unreleased Francois K 7" Mix) - 3:41
"Doggy Style" (Unreleased demo track) - 3:48
"Night They Vietcong" (Unreleased demo track) - 3:06
"Big Big Man" (Unreleased demo track) - 3:28
"Rip Down" (Demo version) - 3:15
"Apollo 9" (Francois K Splashdown Mix) - 6:46
"Vive Le Rock" (Unreleased US 7" Mix) - 3:49

Personnel
Adam Ant – lead vocals, piano
Marco Pirroni – guitars
Chris Constantinou (as Chris DeNiro) – bass, backing vocals
"Count" Bogdan Wiczling – drums, percussion

 Technical
 Tony Visconti – producer, engineer
 Sven Taits – assistant engineer
 Francois Kevorkian – mixing
 Ray Staff – mastering
 Adam Ant, Rob O'Connor - sleeve concept
 Nick Knight - photography

References

External links
 

Adam Ant albums
1985 albums
Albums produced by Tony Visconti
Columbia Records albums